Khyber Afghan Airlines was a cargo airline based in Jalalabad, Afghanistan, with its base at Jalalabad Airport. As of September 2018, it suspended all operations with plans to restart them.

References

Defunct airlines of Afghanistan